Darzarun (also Romanized as Darzarūn; also known as Darzin) is a village in Amjaz Rural District, in the Central District of Anbarabad County, Kerman Province, Iran. At the 2006 census, its population was 27, in 9 families.

References 

Populated places in Anbarabad County